General audience may refer to:

 The public
 Audience measurement
 Audience (meeting)
 General Audience or General Audiences, used in the motion picture content rating systems of various countries